Mega Babies is an animated children's television series created by the Tremblay brothers, Christian and Yvon, who previously had made the Hanna-Barbera show SWAT Kats: The Radical Squadron. It is produced by CinéGroupe and Landmark Entertainment Group in association with Sony Wonder.

The series was broadcast on Fox Family Channel and Teletoon. The show was also aired in UK on Sky One's weekday mornings and later repeated on Channel 5 on weekend mornings between 2001 and 2002.

Synopsis
The show is about a trio of mutant babies who are three characters that fight off evil monsters and aliens. Their names are Meg, Derrick and Buck and their care-giver's name is Nurse Lazlo. The show takes place in Your City, USA.

After their birth, they are brought to an orphanage.  When the entire solar system aligned itself, the babies and their nurse were struck by lightning.  The babies were given super strength and other powers, and Nurse Lazlo's IQ rose.

Voice actors
Buck was voiced by Sonja Ball, Dean Hagopian voiced many male characters, Laura Teasdale did Derrick's voice, Meg was voiced by Jaclyn Linetsky, and Bronwen Mantel voiced Nurse Lazlo.

Even though the voice acting was done in Montreal, the voice directing was done by Vancouver based veteran voice actor and voice director Terry Klassen who has done voiceovers for many animated television series and films such as voicing Krillin in the Ocean dubbed version of Dragon Ball Z. Klassen has also voice directed other works such as Ed, Edd n Eddy, Johnny Test, Cardcaptors, several Barbie films, and more recently, My Little Pony: Friendship is Magic. This was the only time that Klassen has ever voice directed an animated project outside of Vancouver. During the later episodes, Terrence Scammell, who also voiced several characters in the series, as well as providing the main title narration, took over as voice director. Scammell has also done many voice acting roles for film, television and video games in both Montreal and Ottawa, Ontario.

Production
The show was announced in January 1999 as a co-production between CinéGroupe and Sony Wonder set to premier on the Fox Family Channel in fall of that year. The show was created by Christian and Yvon Tremblay and Landmark Entertainment Group budgeted between $5.9 million (C$9 million) and $6.6 million for 52 10-minute episodes which were pre-produced in Montreal and animated in Asia then bundled into 26 half-hour daily shows.

Episodes

Season 1 (1999)

Season 2 (2000)

Video game
Entitled with the same name, this video game based on the show was developed and published by Global Star Software in 2000, exclusively for PC.

Reception
Mega Babies was not well received by critics and audiences, and was criticised for its excessive crude and gross-out humor, especially for a children’s series .  WatchMojo ranked the series #4 in a "Top 10 Most Embarrassing ‘90s Cartoons" list. IMDb's user score for the series, as of November 2022, is 2.6 out of 10.

References

External links
 

1990s American animated television series
2000s American animated television series
1999 American television series debuts
2000 American television series endings
1990s Canadian animated television series
2000s Canadian animated television series
1999 Canadian television series debuts
2000 Canadian television series endings
American children's animated action television series
American children's animated adventure television series
American children's animated comedy television series
American children's animated comic science fiction television series
Canadian children's animated action television series
Canadian children's animated adventure television series
Canadian children's animated comedy television series
Canadian children's animated comic science fiction television series
Television shows filmed in Montreal
Fox Family Channel original programming
Teletoon original programming
Television series by Sony Pictures Television
Television shows set in the United States
Animated television series about children